The South African Railways Class NG G13 2-6-2+2-6-2 of 1927 was a narrow gauge articulated steam locomotive.

Between 1927 and 1929, the South African Railways placed twelve Class NG G13 Garratt articulated steam locomotives with a 2-6-2+2-6-2 Double Prairie type wheel arrangement in service on the Langkloof and Alfred County Railway narrow gauge lines.

Manufacturer

In 1927, Hannoversche Maschinenbau (Hanomag), in consultation with the South African Railways (SAR), designed a locomotive which was to become the standard  narrow gauge Garratt locomotive in South Africa for the next forty years.

How Garratts, to which Beyer, Peacock & Company held the patent, came to be designed and built by the German firm of Hanomag was the result of the coming into power of the Pact Government in South Africa in 1924. With strong anti-British sentiments amongst Afrikaners in the new government still lingering after the Second Boer War, British manufacturers were avoided whenever possible.

The initial order was for three Class NG G13 locomotives, numbered in the range from NG58 to NG60, which were delivered and placed in service in November 1927. Performance trials of the Class NG G13 proved it to be both powerful and free steaming despite having a smaller grate area than the predecessor . This resulted in an immediate order for another two locomotives, numbers NG49 and NG50, and even before these two were delivered, another seven numbered in the range from NG77 to NG83. The second and third orders were both delivered in 1928 with the third order locomotives entering service during January 1929.

Characteristics
The locomotive was greatly improved from the Class NG G11, with trailing wheels added to each engine unit, outside bar frames instead of plate frames, round-topped fireboxes instead of Belpaire fireboxes, and larger dimensions in most respects except the grate area. They were superheated and sported an extremely compact arrangement of Walschaerts valve gear and outside bar frames. The leading wheels were arranged as conventional pony trucks, while the inner carrying wheels were built to the Gölsdorf system which allowed the axle some lateral movement.

Some rectifiable shortcomings were cylinders with old-fashioned short-travel valves with Z-ported cylinders, plain bearings on the inner carrying wheels that were inclined to run hot and a cab that was too small and unbearably hot in summer. The heat was made worse by the steam turret, vacuum-brake ejector and sight-feed lubricator that were placed inside the cab. Since the seats of the driver and stoker were mounted on poles which allowed them to be swung around to outside the cab, crews could often be seen riding outside to escape the heat.

As built, the sandboxes were mounted on the front of the water tank and rear of the coal bunker, one on either side of each headlight. On some locomotives the front sandboxes were later relocated to the top of the tank.

Service
The introduction of articulated locomotives on the  narrow gauge branches gave this gauge a new lease of life and made it easier to withstand the agitation from some quarters to convert these branches to Cape gauge. Apart from appreciable economies in working, the Garratts enabled train loads and the carrying capacity of the narrow gauge lines to be virtually doubled without the need to strengthen track and bridges.

Natal
The first five locomotives, numbers NG49, NG50 and NG58 to NG60, were used almost exclusively on the narrow gauge lines in Natal. Some of these routes had curves of  radius and gradients of up to 3 in 100 (3%), but the Garratts were well suited to hauling the diverse freight traffic of pulpwood, sugar cane and bananas.

One of these lines, the  branch line from Port Shepstone to Paddock via Izotsha, was eventually privatised as the Port Shepstone and Alfred County Railway (ACR) after the SAR ceased operations there in 1986. The ACR conducted both freight and tourist passenger operations, with the tourist train becoming known as the Banana Express.

Cape Province
The third order of seven locomotives, numbers NG77 to NG83, initially all went to the Avontuur Railway in the Langkloof where most of them remained for their entire service lives. In 1965, numbers NG77 and NG78 were exchanged for two Class NG G11 locomotives, numbers NG54 and NG55, from the Natal system.

The  Avontuur line stretches from Port Elizabeth to Avontuur through the Langkloof. The narrow gauge track enabled the trains to pick up fruit virtually directly from the Langkloof fruit farms and ship it directly, without reloading, to the ripening warehouses, distributors and ships at Port Elizabeth. The route became known as the Apple Express after the main crop it transported. The line also carried pulpwood as well as limestone to supply the cement factories which were located on the route.

The arrival of the Class NG G13s at Humewood Road in Port Elizabeth in 1928 came soon after the Avontuur Railway’s transition from a lightly-trafficked developmental line to a narrow-gauge heavy hauler when the new cement works at New Brighton were opened. Being able to take almost double the load of a Class NG10 locomotive, they were mainly used on the limestone traffic, but were also employed up and down the Langkloof.

At the Limebank Quarry near Loerie, quarried limestone was crushed and loaded into buckets carried on an overhead ropeway from the quarry to bunkers at Loerie. In 1954, the cement company doubled its quarry output capacity when a second parallel ropeway was placed in service. A limitation in the capacity of the limestone trains throughout the steam haulage era was that double heading by Garratt locomotives was not permitted to protect their pivots from excessive stresses. It therefore became common practice to run heavier Garratt-headed trains of up to 14 wagons with a Class NG10 helper cut in to the train some eight to ten wagons back. From a passing loop at Summit, the Garratt would continue to Chelsea unassisted whilst the helper returned down the hill to Loerie.

Retirement
The Avontuur Garratts ended their service lives working out of Loerie, either hauling limestone trains to Van Stadens or doing duty on the Patensie branch line. When the lower section of the Avontuur Railway was dieselised upon the arrival of the Class  diesel-electric locomotives in 1973, the Class NG G13 locomotives were all withdrawn from service. Beginning at about the same time, the Natal locomotives were also progressively withdrawn from service.

Preservation
Since withdrawal from SAR service, some locomotives were sold into private hands whilst others ended up in various degrees of preservation ranging across the spectrum from operational to plinthing to total abandonment. No. NG49, is operational at the Sandstone Estates near Ficksburg. Three were plinthed, no. NG80 at Joubertina station, no. NG81 at Patensie station and no. NG83 at Avontuur (until 1988 when it was sold and shipped to Germany then overhauled to operating condition with a new boiler. No. NG50 was shipped to Texas USA and is operational at the Hempstead and Northern Railroad in Hempstead, Texas No. 60 was sold to Switzerland arriving there in July 1986 then fully overhauled to operating condition before being sold on to Wales due to operating constraints.

The last known locations of all the Class NG G13 locomotives are listed in the table.

References

External links

Steam locomotives of South Africa
Hanomag locomotives
2-6-2+2-6-2 locomotives
Garratt locomotives
2 ft gauge locomotives
Railway locomotives introduced in 1927